François Louis Jules Dupré (3 December 1888 – 26 June 1966) was a French, hotelier, art collector, and owner of the Thoroughbred horse breeding and racing farm, Haras d'Ouilly. He was a grandson of the painter Jules Dupré.

Dupré served in the French Army during World War I. Seriously wounded during battle, he was hospitalized for a considerable length of time. He went on to a career in business that saw him become the owner of two luxury hotels in Paris, the prestigious Hotel George V, Paris and the Hotel Plaza Athenée. In addition, in 1947, Dupré acquired the Hotel Ritz in Montreal, Canada. In 1937, while traveling by passenger liner across the Atlantic, Dupré met twenty-five-year-old Anna Stefanna Nagy who would become his second wife.

Thoroughbred horse racing
Dupré was friends with Duke Louis Decazes, a Thoroughbred racehorse enthusiast who owned the Haras d'Ouilly stud farm in Pont-d'Ouilly, Calvados. Beginning in 1921, the two partnered in several racehorses and in 1930 Dupré purchased the Haras d'Ouilly property. He became one of Europe's leading breeders and owners, winning numerous important conditions races in France and England. His horse Tantième had back-to-back wins in the Prix de l'Arc de Triomphe in 1950 and '51, and in 1963 Relko won The Derby.

Major horse races won 
Races in France:
Prix de l'Arc de Triomphe
 Tantième
Prix de l'Abbaye de Longchamp
Texana (1957)
Fortino (1962)
Texanita (1963 & 1964)
Grand Prix de Paris
Danseur (1966)
Grand Prix de Saint-Cloud
 Match (1962)
Poule d'Essai des Pouliches
Virgule (1954)
Solitude (1961)
La Sega (1962)
Bella Paola (1968) raced by Madame Dupré
Koblenza (1969) raced by Madame Dupré
Poule d'Essai des Poulains
Relko (1963)
Prix du Jockey Club
 Reliance (1965)
 Rheffic (1971) raced by Madame Dupré
Prix Noailles
 Tanerko (1956)
 Match (1961)
 Prix Royal-Oak
 Match (1961)

Races in England:
1,000 Guineas (Newmarket Racecourse)
Bella Paola (1968) raced by Madame Dupré
Epsom Derby
Relko (1963)
Coronation Cup
Relko (1964)
King George VI and Queen Elizabeth Stakes
 Match (1962)

Races in the United States:
Washington, D.C. International Stakes
 Match (1962)

Death

François Dupré died in 1966 at his estate in Jamaica. His widow Anna ran the racing operation until 1977 when she sold the entire bloodstock for £1.3 million to the Aga Khan IV. The Dupré's famous colors of gray with a pink cap were taken over by Jean-Luc Lagardère who would buy Haras d'Ouilly in 1981.

References

 Pont-d'Ouilly municipal website with the history of Haras d'Ouilly 
 "Best in the World". Time. 23 November 1962. About Dupré winning the Washington D.C. International.

1888 births
1966 deaths
Businesspeople from Paris
French military personnel of World War I
French hoteliers
French racehorse owners and breeders
Owners of Epsom Derby winners
Art collectors from Paris
Owners of Prix de l'Arc de Triomphe winners